The Torneo Fermín Garicoits was a Uruguayan football tournament organized by the Uruguayan Football Association in 1965.

That year, by decision of the Assembly of Clubs, the traditional Torneo Competencia was not played, being replaced by this special tournament held prior to the Uruguayan Championship.

List of champions

Titles by club

1965 Torneo Fermín Garicoits

Group Stage

Serie A "Círculo de Cronistas Deportivos del Uruguay"

Serie B "Asociación de Reporteros Gráficos"

Final

References

H
Recurring sporting events established in 1965
1965 establishments in Uruguay